Alina Zmushka (born 5 January 1997) is a Belarusian swimmer. She competed in the women's 100 metre breaststroke at the 2019 World Aquatics Championships. In 2021, she represented Belarus at the 2020 Summer Olympics held in Tokyo, Japan.

References

External links
 

1997 births
Living people
Belarusian female breaststroke swimmers
Swimmers at the 2014 Summer Youth Olympics
Swimmers at the 2020 Summer Olympics
Olympic swimmers of Belarus